Nemacheilus doonensis is a species of ray-finned fish in the genus Nemacheilus, although it has also been placed in the genus Schistura. from Dehra Dun in Uttar Pradesh where it occurs in clear, swift streams with pebbly beds.

Footnotes 
 

D
Fish described in 1977